The Río Naranjo is a river in south-west Guatemala. Its sources are located in the Sierra Madre in the western department of San Marcos. From there it flows past the town Coatepeque in the department of Quetzaltenango through the coastal plains of Retalhuleu into the Pacific Ocean.

References

Rivers of Guatemala